Otmar Gazzari (1905 in Hvar – 1987 in Zagreb) was an Italian footballer who played as a goalkeeper. Throughout his career he played for Hajduk Split and BSK Belgrade in the First League of the Kingdom of Yugoslavia.

While playing in Hajduk Split he played together with his brother Renzo, that would continue his career in Italian Serie A also becoming B international player for the Italy national football team. With Hajduk he played a total of 37 official matches, of which 17 were in the Yugoslav Championship.

Otmar played a total of 165 matches for Hajduk and won one national championship, before moving to Belgrade to play in BSK where he would be national champion in two more occasions.

Unlike his brother, that after retiring from football dedicated to tennis, Otmar opted to have a career in baseball.

Honours
Hajduk Split
Yugoslav First League: 1927
BSK Beograd
Yugoslav First League: 1930–31 and 1932–33

References

1905 births
1987 deaths
Italian footballers
Italian expatriate footballers
HNK Hajduk Split players
U.S. Triestina Calcio 1918 players
OFK Beograd players
Yugoslav First League players
Expatriate footballers in Yugoslavia
Association football goalkeepers
Italian expatriate sportspeople in Yugoslavia